Seyyedlar-e Zahra (also Romanized as Seyyedlar-e Zahrā; also known as Mūrān and Seyyedlar-e Mūrān) is a village in Ojarud-e Sharqi Rural District, Muran District, Germi County, Ardabil Province, Iran. At the 2006 census, its population was 89, in 20 families.

References 

Towns and villages in Germi County